The Faulkes Telescope South is a clone of the Liverpool Telescope and is located at Siding Spring Observatory in New South Wales, Australia. It is a  Ritchey-Chrétien telescope.  It was designed to be operated remotely with the aim of encouraging an interest in science by young people. It is supported by an altazimuth mount.

The telescope is owned and operated by LCOGT. This telescope and its sister telescope Faulkes Telescope North are used by research and education groups across the globe. The Faulkes Telescope Project is one such group which provides observing time (awarded by LCOGT) for educational projects for UK schools.  Funds were initially sourced by charitable donations from philanthropist Dr. Martin C. Faulkes.

Faulkes Telescope South saw first light in 2004 with full operations occurring by 2006.

Discoveries
2008 HJ is a small near-Earth asteroid which at the time of its discovery was the most rapidly rotating object in the solar system.

Observations
On the 4 May 2007 the first ever observation of one of the satellites of Uranus passing in front of another was made by Marton Hidas and Tim Brown.

In 2013 it was used to image the Near-Earth asteroid 2013 XY8.

See also
List of largest optical reflecting telescopes
Liverpool Telescope
List of telescopes of Australia

References

External links
 Faulkes Telescope website
 The RoboNet global network which controls the Faulkes Telescopes over the internet

Robotic telescopes
Siding Spring Observatory
2004 establishments in Australia